The Spain national under-19 football team represents Spain in international football at this age level and is controlled by Royal Spanish Football Federation, the governing body for football in Spain. It is the most successful U-19 national team in Europe with eight continental titles.

Competitive record

UEFA European Under-19 Championship Record

*Denotes draws include knockout matches decided on penalty kicks.
Gold background color indicates first-place finish. Silver background color indicates second-place finish.

Individual awards
Spain's U-19 players have won individual awards at UEFA European Under-19 Football Championship tournaments.

Current squad
 The following players were called up for the friendly match.
 Match dates: 25 October 2022
 Opposition: Caps and goals correct as of: 25 October 2022, after the match against 

Player records
 Top Appearances Note: Club(s) represents the permanent clubs during the player's time in the Under-19s.

 Top Goalscorers Note:' Club(s)'' represents the permanent clubs during the player's time in the Under-19s.

Former squads
2019 UEFA European Under-19 Championship squads – Spain
2015 UEFA European Under-19 Championship squads – Spain
2013 UEFA European Under-19 Championship squads – Spain
2012 UEFA European Under-19 Championship squads – Spain
2011 UEFA European Under-19 Championship squads – Spain
2010 UEFA European Under-19 Championship squads – Spain
2009 UEFA European Under-19 Championship squads – Spain
2008 UEFA European Under-19 Championship squads – Spain
2007 UEFA European Under-19 Championship squads – Spain
2006 UEFA European Under-19 Championship squads – Spain
2004 UEFA European Under-19 Championship squads – Spain
2002 UEFA European Under-19 Championship squads – Spain

See also
Spain national football team
Spain national under-23 football team
Spain national under-21 football team
Spain national under-20 football team
Spain national under-18 football team
Spain national under-17 football team
Spain national under-16 football team
Spain national under-15 football team
Spain national youth football team

References

External links

 by RFEF
Tournament archive at UEFA
UEFA U-19 European Championship at RSSSF

European national under-19 association football teams
Football